A parietal callus is a feature of the shell anatomy of some groups of snails, i.e. gastropods. It is a thickened calcareous deposit which may be present on the parietal wall of the aperture of the adult shell. The parietal wall is the margin of the aperture and part of the wall of the body whorl that is closest to the columella. The callus is often smooth and glossy, but can also be decorated with raised ribs or wrinkles.

This feature is found in such marine families as Ranellidae (pictured), Cassidae, Nassariidae, Ringiculidae and others. It is also found in some families of land snails, terrestrial pulmonates.

See also 
 Gastropod shell
 Aperture (mollusc)

References

Gastropod anatomy
Mollusc shells